Kermajan (also Romanized as Kermājān; also known as Karmān Jān) is a village in Kermajan Rural District, in the Central District of Kangavar County, Kermanshah Province, Iran. At the 2006 census, its population was 663, in 161 families.

References 

Populated places in Kangavar County